The Red River Fault or  Song Hong Fault is a major fault in Yunnan, China and Vietnam which accommodates continental China's (Yangtze Plate) southward movement It is coupled with that of the Sagaing Fault in Burma, which accommodates the Indian plate's northward movement, with the land (Indochina) in between faulted and twisted clockwise. It was responsible for the 1970 Tonghai earthquake.

It is named after the Red River which runs through the valley eroded along the fault trace.

The Red River Fault was a sinistral strike-slip shear zone until Miocene times when it became reactivated as a brittle dextral strike-slip fault.

See also
1970 Tonghai earthquake
1925 Dali earthquake
2021 Dali earthquake

References

Geology of Vietnam
Geology of China
Seismic faults of Asia
Strike-slip faults